The seven members of the Swiss Federal Council constitute the federal government of Switzerland and collectively serve as the country's head of state. Each of the seven Federal Councillors heads a department of the Swiss federal administration.

The current Swiss Federal Councillors are: Alain Berset (first elected in 2011), Guy Parmelin (first elected in 2015), Ignazio Cassis (first elected in 2017), Viola Amherd (first elected in 2018), Karin Keller-Sutter (first elected in 2018), Albert Rösti (first elected in 2022), and Élisabeth Baume-Schneider (first elected in 2022)

The members of the Federal Council are elected for a term of four years by both chambers of the federal parliament sitting together as the United Federal Assembly. Each Federal Councillor is elected individually by secret ballot by an absolute majority of votes. People elected to the Federal Council are considered a Federal Councillor even if they decline the election. Accordingly, the five persons who were elected but never assumed office are listed in a separate table below. For the same reason, the principal table only records the date of election and not the date on which the Federal Councillors assumed their office.

Once elected for a four-year-term, Federal Councillors can neither be voted out of office by a motion of no confidence nor can they be impeached. Reelection is possible for an indefinite number of terms. The Federal Assembly has decided not to reelect a sitting Federal Councillor four times and only twice (in 2003 and 2007) since the beginning of the 20th century. In practice, therefore, Federal Councillors serve until they decide to resign and retire to private life, usually after three to five terms of office.


Members

Legend:

 In January 2009, it merged with the Liberal Party (LPS/PLS) and became FDP.The Liberals.

; since January 2009, the party has merged with the Free Democratic Party (FDP/PRD) in order to form FDP.The Liberals.
 

The Federal Councillors currently serving are indicated with bold type.

Members who declined their election

Five people have declined their election to the Federal Council by the Federal Assembly. Their number here is that of the Federal Councillor in the list above who was later elected in their place.

Notes and references

External links 

 
 
 
 
 
 

Switzerland, Federal Council
Members